Jamal Williams (born April 28, 1976) is an American former professional football player who was a nose tackle in the National Football League (NFL) for thirteen seasons. He was drafted by the San Diego Chargers in the second round of the 1998 Supplemental Draft. He played college football for Oklahoma State Cowboys. After three consecutive All-Pro seasons (2004, 2005, 2006) in the NFL, Williams—at a massive 6′3″, 350 pounds—was described as a "textbook block-of-granite noseman" by Sports Illustrated′s Peter King in 2007.

Early years
Williams is the second oldest of seven boys, was raised in Washington, D.C. by his mother, Harriet, a single parent. A two-time All-Met selection at Archbishop Carroll High School in Washington, Williams played linebacker at 6′3″, 255 pounds. He was named a Super Prep All-American in 1994.

Williams attended Oklahoma State University, where he played for the Cowboys in 1995.  In 1996, he transferred to Kemper Military School and Junior College in Boonville, Missouri, where he was a standout in the junior college ranks.  In 1997, Williams returned to Oklahoma State and was a first-team All-Big 12 Conference selection.  He finished his career with 117 tackles and 9.5 sacks. He majored in sociology at OSU.

Professional career

San Diego Chargers
Williams was drafted in the second-round of the 1998 NFL Supplemental Draft by the San Diego Chargers. The highlight of his rookie season occurred on December 13, when he scored a touchdown on a 14-yard interception return against the Seattle Seahawks.  He finished the season with 6 tackles (5 solo), 1 pass deflection, and 1 interception in 9 games.  In 1999, he recorded 26 tackles (22 solo), 1 sack, and 2 pass deflections in 16 games (2 starts).  In 2000, Williams finished with 52 tackles (45 solo), 1 sack, and 1 forced fumble in 16 starts.  He suffered a season-ending injury in the 3rd game of the 2001 season and finished with just 2 solo tackles.  However, he worked his way back into the starting line-up in 2002, earning the Ed Block Courage Award for his efforts.  Williams recorded 23 tackles (19 solo), 2.5 sacks, 1 forced fumble, and 2 pass deflections in 12 games during the 2002 season.  During the 2003 season, Williams posted totals of 33 tackles (24 solo), 1 sack, 1 forced fumble, and 1 pass deflection in 15 games.

The Chargers switched to a 3-4 defensive scheme in 2004 and fielded Williams at nose tackle, arguably the most important position in the 3-4 defense.  Williams recorded 32 tackles (25 solo), 4 sacks, and 4 pass deflections in 15 games.  He became widely recognized as one of the top 3-4 nose tackles in the NFL and was named an AP 2nd Team All-Pro, and was also selected as the Chargers' Defensive Player of the Year as well as Lineman of the Year. In the 2005 season, Williams recorded 53 tackles (40 solo) and 4 pass deflections in 16 games and was named a Pro Bowl starter and was named 1st Team All-Pro by the Associated Press and The Sporting News, He Again Was Selected Chargers Defensive Player of the year And Lineman of the year for the Second Time in his Career. He finished the 2006 season with 69 tackles (49 solo), 2 sacks, and 2 pass deflections in 16 games and was again named a Pro Bowl starter, as well as 1st Team All-Pro by the AP, The Sporting News, and the Football Writers Association of America, And Was selected Chargers Lineman of the Year for the Third time in his Career. During the 2007 season, Williams recorded 39 tackles (32 solo), 1 forced fumble, and 2 pass deflections in 13 games and was named a Pro Bowl reserve following the season.  Williams finished 2008 with 56 tackles (46 solo), 1.5 sacks, and 3 pass deflections in 16 games, Williams Was Selected Chargers Defensive Player of the Year (For The Third Time In his Career), Lineman of the Year (For The fourth Time In His Career) And Co-Most Valuable Player With Philip Rivers. In 2009, Williams suffered a season-ending triceps injury in the first game and finished with just 3 solo tackles. He was named to the Chargers 50th Anniversary Team that year. On March 4, 2010, Williams was released by the Chargers.

Williams was inducted into the Chargers Hall of Fame in 2022.

Denver Broncos

On March 9, 2010, Williams signed a 3-year, $16-million contract with the Broncos with $7-million guaranteed and an additional $6-million available through incentives.

On March 3, 2011, the Broncos released Williams.

Personal life
In 1999, Williams married to singer-songwriter Surel Williams (née Sureldie Rycha Davis) of Lancaster, Texas. The couple has 2 daughters: Joy and Jasmine Williams. The couple raise their children between Plano, Texas and San Diego, California.

References

1976 births
Living people
American Conference Pro Bowl players
American football defensive tackles
Oklahoma State Cowboys football players
San Diego Chargers players
Denver Broncos players
Players of American football from Washington, D.C.
Archbishop Carroll High School (Washington, D.C.) alumni
Ed Block Courage Award recipients